Tarun Chatterjee (born 14 January 1945) is a former Justice of the Supreme Court of India and Chairman of Uttar Pradesh Human Rights Commission.

Family
Chatterjee is the son of Justice Late Purshottam Chatterjee, former Judge of the Calcutta High Court. His great grandfather Digambar Chatterjee was also a Judge of Calcutta High Court in British India. Justice Chatterjee married Kumkum Chatterjee. Their son Aniruddha Chatterjee is a practicing Advocate of Calcutta High Court.

Career
Chatterjee passed B.Sc., LL.B. and was enrolled as an Advocate in 1970. He started practice in the Calcutta High Court in Civil, Criminal and Constitutional matters. He became the permanent Judge in the same High Court on 6 August 1990. In 2003 he was appointed the Chief Justice of the Allahabad High Court. Justice Chatterjee was elevated in the post of Judge of Supreme Court of India on 27 August 2004. He retired on 14 January 2010. After the retirement he became the Chairman of Uttar Pradesh Human Rights Commission.

Controversy
In 2010, an extensive Central Bureau of Investigation (CBI) investigation into the fraudulent withdrawal of Rs 6.58 crore from the provident fund accounts of class III and IV employees in the Ghaziabad district court, found few names of Judges in Higher Judiciary. The report submitted by CBI was perused by a Bench comprising Justices D. K. Jain, V. S. Sirpurkar and G. S. Singhvi which mentioned the name of Justice Chatterjee. But he denied the allegations.

References

1945 births
Living people
Indian judges
Justices of the Supreme Court of India
Chief Justices of the Allahabad High Court
Judges of the Calcutta High Court
20th-century Indian judges
20th-century Indian lawyers